Old Heidelberg is a German romantic play by Wilhelm Meyer-Förster first performed in 1901. While studying at the Heidelberg University, Prince Karl from Saxony falls in love with Käthie, an innkeeper's daughter, but has to give her up when his father dies, and he is called to return to his homeland and rule as King.

The play was based on Meyer-Förster's own 1898 novel Karl Heinrich. The play's title alludes to a poem by Joseph Victor von Scheffel.  The work was a major international success and became one of the most performed plays in Germany during the first half of the 20th century.

Adaptations

Film
Owing to the story's popularity it has been turned into films on numerous occasions, including the American silent film Old Heidelberg (1915), the German silent film Old Heidelberg (1923), Ernst Lubitsch's The Student Prince in Old Heidelberg (1926), and Ernst Marischka's Old Heidelberg (1959).

Operetta
In 1924 the play provided the basis for the 1924 operetta The Student Prince composed by Sigmund Romberg to a libretto by Dorothy Donnelly. The operetta was the basis for the 1954 film The Student Prince.

Opera
In 1908, the play was the basis for a libretto by Alberto Colantuoni, titled Eidelberga Mia, with music by Ubaldo Pacchierotti; it was later translated into German by Ottoman Piltz in 1909 under the original German title.

Bibliography
 Zacharasiewicz, Waldemar. Images of Germany in American Literature. University of Iowa Press, 2007.
Everett, William A. & Block, Geoffrey Holden. Sigmund Romberg. Yale University Press,  2007.

External links
English translation of the novel
Review of a 1910 New York revival of the play in The New York Times

References

Plays by Wilhelm Meyer-Förster
1901 plays
Plays based on novels
Plays set in Germany
German plays adapted into films